Zoltán Horváth (born 12 March 1937) is a Hungarian retired sabre fencer. At the 1960 Olympics, he won the gold medal in the team competition, and the individual silver medal behind teammate Rudolf Kárpáti. Horváth also took part in the 1964 Olympics, placing fifth in the team competition.

At world championships, his biggest success came in 1962, when he won the individual competition and placed second with the team. Horváth had already won two gold medals in the team competitions of the 1957 and 1958 world championships, and gained a third in 1966.

References 

1937 births
Living people
People from Balatonfüred
Hungarian male sabre fencers
Olympic fencers of Hungary
Olympic gold medalists for Hungary
Olympic silver medalists for Hungary
Fencers at the 1960 Summer Olympics
Fencers at the 1964 Summer Olympics
Olympic medalists in fencing
Medalists at the 1960 Summer Olympics
Sportspeople from Veszprém County
20th-century Hungarian people